Weitao Yang (born March 31, 1961) is a Chinese-born American chemist who is the Philip Handler Professor of Chemistry at Duke University. His main contributions to chemistry include density functional theory development, and its applications to chemistry.

Biography
Yang was born in Chaozhou, Guangdong, China on March 31, 1961. He entered Peking University in 1978 as part of the first generation of college students after the Cultural Revolution. He received his BS in chemistry in 1982, after which he studied theoretical chemistry as a PhD student with Robert G. Parr at the University of North Carolina, Chapel Hill. He completed his PhD degree in 1986, and worked as a postdoc with Robert G. Parr (1986-1987) and William H. Miller (1988-1989). Yang currently works in the Department of Chemistry at Duke University since 1990, as Assistant Professor, Associate Professor, Professor, and Philip Handler Professor of Chemistry.

Contributions
Yang's main contributions to theoretical chemistry range from fundamental theory to applications of density functional theory. He (with Parr) developed the concepts of the Fukui function, hardness, and softness in density functional theory. He also justified the theoretical ground of potential functional (as in Optimized-Effective-Potential methods) and fractional-number-of-electron approaches.
The Lee–Yang–Parr (shortened to LYP) correlation functional by Yang and his coworkers is extensively used in chemistry and was the second most cited article in chemistry from 1999 to 2006. Yang developed the Divide and Conquer algorithm  for linear-scaling density functional theory. In application, Yang also developed methods in QM/MM simulation for large chemistry and biology systems. His book with Robert G. Parr, Density-Functional Theory of Atoms and Molecules, is considered to be the basic textbook in the field of density functional theory.

Awards and honors
 1997 Annual Medal of the International Academy of Quantum Molecular Science
 1999–2006 The Lee–Yang–Parr correlation energy functional, also known as the LYP functional (Phys. Rev. B 37, 785, 1988) has been the second most cited paper in chemistry for all seven years from 1999 to 2006 since CAS started publishing citation data online. Number of citations is over 25,000.
 2003 Elected a  Fellow of the American Physical Society. 
 2006 Humboldt Research Award for Senior U.S. Scientists
 2010 International Solvay Chair in Chemistry, International Solvay Institutes for Physics and Chemistry, Brussels, Belgium
 2012 American Chemical Society National Award for Computers in Chemical and Pharmaceutical Research

Family life
He is married with Helen Wen Yang with two children.

See also
 Density functional theory
 Robert G. Parr

References

External links
Homepage of Weitao Yang

1961 births
Living people
21st-century American chemists
Duke University faculty
Members of the International Academy of Quantum Molecular Science
Theoretical chemists
Computational chemists
People from Chaozhou
Chemists from Guangdong
Peking University alumni
University of North Carolina at Chapel Hill alumni
Chinese emigrants to the United States
Educators from Guangdong
Fellows of the American Physical Society